Arkiv för matematik, astronomi och fysik (standard abbreviation Ark. Mat. Astr. Fys.) was a scientific journal edited by the Royal Swedish Academy of Sciences (Kungliga Svenska Vetenskapsakademien). It covered mathematics, astronomy and physics.

It started with volume 1 dated 1903/04. The last volume 32 appeared 1945/46. Then the journal was split into:
 Arkiv för Matematik
 Arkiv för Fysik
 Arkiv för Astronomi
 Arkiv för Geofysik

Contributions were published in English, French, German, and Swedish.

References 

Royal Swedish Academy of Sciences
Multidisciplinary scientific journals
Publications established in 1903
Publications disestablished in 1946
Multilingual journals
English-language journals
French-language journals
German-language journals
Swedish-language journals
1903 establishments in Sweden
1946 disestablishments in Sweden